Lee Fu-an (born 4 June 1964) is a Taiwanese decathlete. In 1990, he set a national record for the pole vault at 5.30 meters. Hsieh Chia-han beat the record by one centimeter in 2011.

Lee twice competed once at the World Championships in Athletics, doing so in 1987, though he failed to complete all ten events. He was twice champion at the Asian Athletics Championships, winning the gold medal at the 1983 and 1989 editions. He was the first man from Taiwan to win that title and was shortly after succeeded by his compatriot Ku Chin-shui.

References

External links

Living people
1964 births
Taiwanese decathletes
Athletes (track and field) at the 1984 Summer Olympics
Athletes (track and field) at the 1988 Summer Olympics
Olympic athletes of Taiwan
World Athletics Championships athletes for Chinese Taipei
Taiwanese male athletes
Fu Jen Catholic University alumni